Sadhvi Prachi is a sadhvi, Hindu political activist, social worker, religious preacher, and member of the Vishwa Hindu Parishad.

Early life
Sadhvi Prachi was born as Prachi Arya in a lower-middle-class Koli famili in Sirsali Village in 's Uttar Pradesh in Bagpat District.

At the age of fourteen, she is said to have attained Nirvana when her village was visited by Yug Purush Maha Mandaleshwar Swami Paramanand Giri Ji Maharaj. She became his disciple and followed him to his ashram in Haridwar and in tours across India, while gaining lessons in oratory. She was conferred the title of Sadhvi (ascetic).

Sadhvi Prachi entered public life and the Sangh Parivar as a trainee and member of the Rashtriya Sevika Samiti, which is the women's arm of the Rashtriya Swayamsevak Sangh (RSS), but gained prominence as a member of the Vishwa Hindu Parishad (VHP).

Education
She was awarded a Master of Arts degree at Gurukul Kangri Vishwavidyalaya. She attended Gurukul Kangri Vishwavidyalaya, obtaining her P.H.D. in Vedas.

Later, she became principal at Arya Kanya Mahavidyalaya Gurukul, Karnal, Haryana.

Death threats and controversies
This has led her to controversies for spreading violence and hatred.

The following is a list of her statements which have triggered controversies and opposition. 

 She triggered a controversy by unleashing a scathing attack on Shah Rukh Khan, calling him a Pakistani agent and  should move there.
 She said "It is big misfortune in our parliament that  we have one to two terrorists sitting there."
 Why are Hindu devotees always under threats during pilgrimages be it Amarnath, Vaishno devi, or puri's Jaganath Temple. If such attacks happen I tell you hajj yatris  will face consequences.
 Those who do not chant Bharat Mata ki jai or Vande Mataram insult national flag and those who indulge in Cow slaughter have no right to live in India.
 After Dadri lynching she said "Those who consume beef deserve such actions"
 Why do they always find Hindu girls for themselves we must boycott Khans.
 Gandhian ways of protests and hunger strikes were worthless in achieving freedom.
 They are trapping our daughters through love jihad.These people who give birth to 35-40 are spreading love jihad. They are trying to make Hindustan, Darul Islam.
 The Nepal earthquake occurred due to visit of Rahul Gandhi who is non-vegetarian. He did not take bath in Holy Ganga. He should have it purified himself.
 I am working to  make India Muslim free.
 Nehru was the biggest rapist on Rahul Gandhi's rape capital remark.

Notes

External links

Further reading
 
 
 
 

Koli people
Hindu activists
20th-century Hindu religious leaders
Rashtriya Swayamsevak Sangh members
Living people
Indian Hindu nuns
Vishva Hindu Parishad members
Durga Vahini members
Far-right politicians in India
Year of birth missing (living people)